Yan Zheng is a marine geochemist known for her research on metals in groundwater and private wells in Bangladesh, China, and the United States. She is an elected fellow of the Geological Society of America and the American Geophysical Union.

Education and career 
Zheng has a B.S. from the University of Science and Technology (1988). She then moved to Columbia University where she earned an M.A. (1993), an M.Phil (1994), and a Ph.D. (1999). Zheng began a position at Queens College, City University of New York in 1998 and was promoted to professor in 2006, and served as the director of the School of Earth and Environmental Sciences from 2012 until 2016. In 2014, she returned to China to hold the position of chair professor at Peking University's Institute of Water Sciences. In 2016 she moved to Southern University of Science and Technology where she is a chair professor.

From 2009 until 2011, she was a specialist at UNICEF Bangladesh working in their water and environmental sanitation group.

Research 
Zheng's early research examined uranium and molybdenum in marine sediments, and used molybdenum concentrations to investigate the Bølling–Allerød warming that occurred 15 thousand years ago. In Bangladesh, Zheng has examined the spatial extent of arsenic in wells, and defined the conditions that lead to the presence of dissolved arsenic in groundwater in the region. In the United States, she has tracked arsenic in groundwater in Maine and considered how to best mitigate the risks associated with arsenic in drinking water. Zheng has worked with others to develop a colorometric assay to detect arsenic which facilitates testing for arsenic in groundwater. Based on her research, she advocates for the need to test individual drinking-water wells for these metals.

Selected publications

Awards and honors 
Zheng became an elected fellow of the Geological Society of America in 2010, and an elected fellow of the American Geophysical Union in 2021. In 2021, she gave the Li Siguang Lecture at the University of Birmingham.

References

External links 

Fellows of the American Geophysical Union
Fellows of the Geological Society of America
Columbia University alumni
Academic staff of the Southern University of Science and Technology
Women geochemists
Living people
Year of birth missing (living people)